The following is a list of notable deaths in June 1997.

Entries for each day are listed alphabetically by surname. A typical entry lists information in the following sequence:
 Name, age, country of citizenship at birth, subsequent country of citizenship (if applicable), reason for notability, cause of death (if known), and reference.

June 1997

1
Florence Wysinger Allen, 84, African American artists' model.
Ruth Atkinson, 78, American cartoonist, cancer.
Garland T. Byrd, 72, American politician from Georgia.
Giorgos P. Livanos, 70, Greek-American shipping magnate.
Fred Rauch, 87, Austrian singer and songwriter.
Mickey Rocco, 81, American baseball player.
Bernard Segal, 89, American lawyer civil rights activist, cancer.
Robert Serber, 88, American physicist, brain cancer.
Nikolai Tikhonov, 92, Soviet Russian-Ukrainian statesman.

2
Lukas Aurednik, 79, Austrian football player and football manager.
Zhenya Belousov, 32, Soviet/Ukrainian pop singer, stroke.
Martin Bronfenbrenner, 82, American economist.
Doc Cheatham, 91, American jazz trumpeter, singer, and bandleader.
Corwin Clatt, 73, American gridiron football player.
Louise Huntington, 92, American actress.
Helen Jacobs, 88, American tennis champion, heart failure.
William Alexander Levy, 87, American architect.
Kenneth McNaught, 78, Canadian historian.
Nikolai Ozerov, 74, Soviet tennis player and actor.
Eddie Thomas, 70, Welsh boxer and manager, cancer.
Ida Turay, 89, Hungarian film actress.

3
Salvatore Fiume, 81, Italian painter, sculptor, architect and writer.
John Holt, 73, Jamaican cricket player.
Dennis James, 79, American television personality and philanthropist, lung cancer.
Meenakshi Shirodkar, 80, Indian actress.

4
Thomas Boylston Adams, 86, American business executive and writer.
Stewart Anderson, 85, Australian rules football player.
Katherine Esau, 99, German-American botanist.
Ronnie Lane, 51, English musician, songwriter, and producer, pneumonia.
Johnny "Hammond" Smith, 63, American soul jazz and hard bop organist, cancer.
Pedro Zaballa, 58, Spanish football player.

5
Jack Wilson Evans, 74, American politician and mayor of Dallas, Texas, cancer.
Elaine Ryan Hedges, 69, American feminist.
Olga Kirsch, 72, South African and Israeli poet, brain tumor, brain cancer.
J. Anthony Lukas, 64, American journalist and author, suicide by hanging.
Gustav Richter, 84, German SS officer and aide to Adolf Eichmann during World War II.

6
Eitel Cantoni, 90, Uruguayan racecar driver.
Magda Gabor, 81, Hungarian-American actress and socialite, and sister of Zsa Zsa and Eva Gabor, kidney failure.
Monica Golding, 94, British Army nurse and nursing administrator.
Charles Jones, 86, Canadian-American composer of contemporary classical music.
Hannu Leminen, 87, Finnish film director, set designer and screenwriter.
Ted Nathanson, 72, American television director, lung cancer.
Richard Neilson, 59, British diplomat.
Liao Shantao, 77, Chinese mathematician.
Alangudi Somu, 64, Indian Tamil film lyricist.

7
Raghu Raj Bahadur, 73, Indian statistician.
Lewis White Beck, 83, American philosopher and scholar of German philosophy.
Jacques Canetti, 88, French music executive and talent manager.
Paul Reade, 54, English composer.
Stanley Schachter, 75, American social psychologist, colon cancer.
Nadezhda Simonyan, 75, Soviet and Russian composer.

8
Betty Andujar, 84, American civic activist and politician.
Norman Cleaveland, 96, American rugby player and Olympian.
Ken Hunt, 62, American baseball player.
Park Jaesam, 64, Korean poet.
Reid Shelton, 72, American actor, stroke.
George Turner, 80, Australian writer and critic.
Amos Tutuola, 76, Nigerian writer, diabetes.
Karen Wetterhahn, 48, American professor of chemistry, mercury poisoning.

9
Károly Bajkó, 52, Hungarian wrestler.
Robert W. Hansen, 86, American lawyer and jurist.
Ismael Huerta, 80, Chilean admiral and politician, cardiac embolism.
Stanley Knowles, 88, Canadian politician.
Yevgeni Lebedev, 80, Soviet and Russian film and theater actor.
Thornton Lee, 90, American baseball player.
Witness Lee, 91/92, Chinese christian preacher and hymnist, cancer.

10
Carolina Cotton, 71, American singer and actress, ovarian cancer.
Leo Fuld, 84, Dutch singer.
Kim Ki-soo, 57, South Korean boxing champion, liver cancer.
Zhou Lin, 85, Chinese politician.

11
Herman Basudde, 38, Ugandan kadongo kamu musician, traffic accident.
Robert Bates, 48, Northern Irish Ulster loyalist, shot.
Thalassa Cruso, 88, British-American presenter and author on horticulture, Alzheimer's disease.
Ben Dunkelman, 83, Canadian-Israeli military officer, heart attack.
Gonzalo Fonseca, 74, Uruguayan artist, stroke.
Ralph Kohl, 73, American football player, coach and scout.
Satyanarayan Rajguru, 93, Indian litterateur, epigraphist and historian.
Mihir Sen, 66, Indian long distance swimmer, combination of Alzheimer's and Parkinson's disease.
Kurt Stöpel, 89, German road bicycle racer.
Lütfiye Sultan, 87, Turkish Ottoman princess.

12
Jo Backaert, 75, Belgian football player.
Rick Baldwin, 42, American racing driver, racing accident.
Pieter d'Hont, 80, Dutch sculptor.
Colette Magny, 70, French singer and songwriter.
Vittorio Mussolini, 80, Italian film critic and producer.
Bulat Okudzhava, 73, Soviet/Russian poet, writer, musician, and singer-songwriter.
Arnaldo Sentimenti, 83, Italian football player and coach.
Veikko Vennamo, 84, Finnish politician.
Joe Ben Wheat, 81, American archaeologist and author.

13
Al Berto, 49, Portuguese poet and painter, lymphoma.
Ladislau Bonyhádi, 74, Romanian football player of Hungarian ethnicity.
Anand Narain Mulla, 95, Indian Urdu poet.
George Strugar, 63. American gridiron football player, lung cancer.

14
Marjorie Best, 94, American costume designer (Giant, Rio Bravo, The Greatest Story Ever Told, Oscar winner (1950).
Helmut Fischer, 70, German actor, carcinoma.
Richard Jaeckel, 70, American actor (The Dirty Dozen, Sometimes a Great Notion. Starman), melanoma.
Helena Sanders, 86, British cultural activist, politician and poet.

15
Nicholas Danby, British organist and composer.
George Denholm, 88, British flying ace during World War II.
Frode Jakobsen, 90, Danish author and politician.
Edmond Leburton, 82, Belgian politician and Prime Minister.
Robert C. McEwen, 77, American politician.
Attilio Redolfi, 73, Italian-French racing cyclist.
Son Sen, 67, Cambodian communist politician and soldier, summary execution.
Dal Stivens, 85, Australian writer.

16
Mariya Batrakova, 74, Soviet and Russian Red Army officer and Hero of the Soviet Union.
Rolf Ericson, 74, Swedish jazz trumpeter.
Badi-ud-din Mahmud, 92, Sri Lankan politician.
Elizabeth McBride, 42, American costume designer (Driving Miss Daisy, Thelma & Louise, The Shawshank Redemption), cancer.
Michael O'Herlihy, 68, Irish television producer and director.
Sukumaran, 49, Indian film actor and producer, heart attack.
Sue Sumii, 95, Japanese social reformer, writer, and novelist.
Tom Søndergaard, 53, Danish football player.
Inge Wersin-Lantschner, 92, Austrian alpine skier and world champion.

17
Frances Foster, 73, American film, television and stage actress, cerebral hemorrhage.
Bernhard Jensen, 85, Danish flatwater canoeist and Olympian.
Maurice Rootes, 80, British film editor.
Hari Krishna Shastri, 59, Indian politician.

18
James Willard Hurst, 86, American legal scholar and law history pioneer, cancer.
Lev Kopelev, 85, Soviet author and dissident.
Devon Russell, Jamaican rocksteady and reggae singer and record producer, brain tumour.
Cândido Tavares, 85, Portuguese football goalkeeper and manager.
José María Fernández Unsáin, 78, Argentine film director, screenwriter, and playwright.
C. Martin Wilbur, 89, American historian and professor at Columbia University.
Héctor Yazalde, 51, Argentine footballer, heart failure.

19
Basu Bhattacharya, Indian film director, acute pancreatitis.
Robert Francis Byrnes, 79, American professor of history, heart attack.
Jiří David, 74, Czech sprinter and Olympian.
Cathleen Delany, 89, Irish actress.
Olga Georges-Picot, 57, French actress, suicide.
Thurman Green, 56, American jazz trombonist.
Bobby Helms, 63, American country music singer, emphysema and asthma.
Robert Henrion, 81, Belgian politician.
Julia Smith, 70, English television director and producer, cancer.
Stan Stasiak, 60, Canadian professional wrestler known as Stan Stasiak, heart failure.

20
John Akii-Bua, 47, Ugandan hurdler and the nation's first Olympic champion.
Armando Brancia, 79, Italian film and television actor.
Paul Carell, 85, German Nazi politician and propagandist.
Henri Haest, 70, Belgian hammer thrower and Olympian.
Cahit Külebi, 80, Turkish poet and author, cancer.
John Michael Macdonald, 91, Canadian politician.
Lawrence Payton, 59, American tenor, songwriter, musician, and record producer, liver cancer.
Alberto Rivera, 61, Spanish anti-Catholic religious activist, colon cancer.

21
Shintarō Katsu, 65, Japanese actor, singer, producer, and director, pharyngeal cancer.
Shantilal Jamnadas Mehta, 92, Indian surgeon and medical academic.
Arthur Prysock, 68, American jazz and R&B singer.
Karl Ridderbusch, 65, German operatic bass.
Fidel Velázquez Sánchez, 97, Mexican union leader, cardiac and respiratory failure.
Vladimir Vinogradov, 75, Soviet diplomat.

22
Lars Bergendahl, 88, Norwegian cross-country skier.
William Slater Brown, 100, American novelist, biographer, and translator of French literature.
Larry Grossman, 53, Canadian politician (Legislative Assembly of Ontario), brain cancer.
Ted Gärdestad, 41, Swedish singer, songwriter, musician, and actor, suicide.
Don Henderson, 65, English actor (Star Wars, The Paradise Club, Strangers), throat cancer.
Paul Napolitano, 74, American basketball player.
Gérard Pelletier, 78, Canadian journalist and politician.

23
Tom Calder, 79, Australian rules football player.
Rosina Lawrence, 84, British-Canadian actress and singer, cancer.
Prince Nico Mbarga, 47, Nigerian Igbo highlife musician, motorcycle accident.
Don Norton, 59, American gridiron football player.
Betty Shabazz, 63, American civil rights advocate and widow of Malcolm X, burns.
Acharya Tulsi, 82, Indian Jain religious leader.

24
Brian Keith, 75, American actor (Family Affair, The Parent Trap, The Russians Are Coming, the Russians Are Coming), suicide.
Paul Lavalle, 88, American conductor, composer, arranger and peron clarinet and saxophone.
Sanjukta Panigrahi, 52, Indian Odissi dancer, cancer.
Leonard B. Strang, 72, British professor of paediatric sciences, cancer.

25
Bobby Blackwood, 62, Scottish footballer.
Jacques Cousteau, 87, French explorer, conservationist, and oceanographer, heart attack.
William Grinnell, 87, American football player and coach, congestive heart failure.
Mario Salvadori, 90, American structural engineer and professor at Columbia University.
Sotim Ulugzoda, 85, Soviet and Tajik writer.

26
George Bassman, 83, American composer and arranger.
Don Bradley, 72, English football player.
Charlie Chester, 83, English comedian, radio and television presenter and writer.
Robert Frucht, 90, German-Chilean mathematician.
Don Hutson, 84, American football player (Green Bay Packers) and member of the Pro Football Hall of Fame.
Israel Kamakawiwoʻole, 38, Native Hawaiian musician and activist, heart attack.
Thomas Joseph Murphy, 64, American prelate in the Catholic Church, cerebral hemorrhage.
William Turnbull, 62, American architect, cancer.

27
Ray Benge, 95, American baseball player.
Narinder Biba, 56, Indian Punjabi singer.
Samuel L. Devine, 81, American politician, cancer.
Joseph Zong Huaide, 80, Chinese Roman Catholic Bishop.
W. O. G. Lofts, 73, British researcher and author.
Harrison Marks, 70, English glamour photographer and director of pornographic films.
Kenneth Neate, 82, Australian tenor, opera producer, composer and author.
Ken Richardson, 85, English racing and test driver.
Ondino Viera, 95, Uruguayan football manager.

28
Gary DeVore, 55, American Hollywood screenwriter, murdered.
Forest Dewey Dodrill, 95, American doctor and inventor of the Dodrill-GMR heart machine.
Jack Hinton, 87, New Zealand soldier during World War II and recipient of the Victoria Cross.
Hubert Lamb, 83, English climatologist.
Hildegard Ochse, 61, German photographer, leukemia.
Friedrich von Mellenthin, 92, German Wehrmacht general during World War II.
Yang Yichen, 83, Chinese politician.

29
Nicholas Cleaveland Bodman, 83, American linguist.
William Hickey, 69, American actor (Prizzi's Honor, National Lampoon's Christmas Vacation, The Nightmare Before Christmas), emphysema and bronchitis.
Marjorie Linklater, 88, Scottish arts and environment campaigner, cancer and heart failure.
Tom Lovell, 88, American illustrator and painter, car accident.
Petey Rosenberg, 79, American basketball player.

30
Gyula Benkő, 78, Hungarian actor and father of actor Péter Benkő.
Su Bingqi, 87, Chinese archaeologist.
William Bradley, 64, English bicycle racer and Olympian.
Larry O'Dea, 53, Australian professional wrestler, liver cancer.
Alcira Soust Scaffo, 73, Uruguayan teacher and poet, respiratory disease.

References 

1997-06
 06